The Pyxidiophorales are an order of fungi in the class Laboulbeniomycetes. The order was created in 2001 to contain the single family Pyxidiophoraceae, circumscribed in 1971. The Pyxidiophoraceae are mostly coprophilous fungi that associate with mites and other arthropods. The type genus, Pyxidiophora, the largest genus of the family, has about 20 species.

References

Ascomycota orders
Laboulbeniomycetes